Centennial High School is a public high school in Las Cruces, New Mexico, United States, and serves approximately 1,538 students in grades 9-12. It is a part of Las Cruces Public Schools.

Construction on the school  began in September 2009, was completed and opened for the beginning of the 2012–2013 school year. The first graduation commencement for Centennial High School was held in the Spring of 2014 including both a valedictorian and a salutatorian.

The campus includes a personal office for each faculty member; an Autism Student Center which is utilized by all the other schools in the district; and a cyber-café, which is open to students during non-academic hours. Each grade level is assigned its own building cluster within the campus and has a designated lunch eating area. While sophomores, juniors, and seniors are fully integrated, freshmen are "segregated" to slowly integrate each student to the school campus, for safety concerns, and to prevent hazing and bullying.

The school employs eighty-two instructors, and has adopted a traditional seven-period scheduling format. On Wednesdays classes are shortened to accommodate an advisory period.
Since the 2018–2019 school year, Columbia Elementary School has been moved to the Freshman Academy, and now C Building  due to mold issues.

Athletics
Athletic teams are known as the Hawks, which was chosen by a popular vote of community members. The Hawks compete in the New Mexico Activities Association (NMAA) Class 6A - District 3. The namesake of the school is due to its opening coinciding with the 100-year anniversary of New Mexico's statehood on January 6, 1912. The school colors are the yellow and red of the Flag of New Mexico.

Through the 2017–18 school year, Centennial has captured five athletic state championships.

References

External links
 

Public high schools in New Mexico
Buildings and structures in Las Cruces, New Mexico
Schools in Doña Ana County, New Mexico
2012 establishments in New Mexico
Educational institutions established in 2012